The following are the telephone codes in The Gambia.

Calling formats
To call in the Gambia, the following format is used:
 yyy xxxx - Calls within the Gambia
 220 yyy xxxx - Calls from outside the Gambia
The NSN length is seven digits.

List of area codes in the Gambia

Old allocations

References

Gambia, The
Telecommunications in the Gambia
Telephone numbers